Chakorabad (also Romanized as Chakorābād; also known as Chagorābād) is a village in Bampur-e Sharqi Rural District, in the Central District of Bampur County, Sistan and Baluchestan Province, Iran. At the 2006 census, its population was 235, in 40 families.

References 

Populated places in Bampur County